Ernest Edward Moffitt (15 September 1871 – 23 March 1899) was an Australian artist.

Life 
Moffitt was born in Bendigo, Victoria the son of John Thomas Lowry Moffitt, draper, and his wife Mary Emily, née Rogers. He was educated at All Saints school, St. Kilda, Melbourne. When Marshall Hall opened his conservatorium of music at the University of Melbourne, Moffitt was the first student to enroll. Moffitt subsequently became secretary of the conservatorium and for a short while studied art at the national gallery school at Melbourne. Moffitt was friendly with a group of the younger artists which included Lionel and Norman Lindsay, did a little painting and etching, but was chiefly remarkable for his beautiful pen drawings. Three of these, reproduced in Lionel Lindsay's A Consideration of the Art of Ernest Moffitt, are especially good, "The Old Well", "Zeehan Wharf", and "A Summer's Day". Moffitt also did three drawings for Hall's Hymn to Sydney.

Legacy
Moffitt died unmarried in 1899 aged just 27, he was buried in St Kilda Cemetery. 
Moffitt was also fond of old English pottery, bound books, carved pipes and Japanese furniture. Marshall Hall financed a book on Moffit by Lionel Lindsay, it acknowledged 'a fine artist and what is saddest, the promise of a great one'.

References

Roger Butler, 'Moffitt, Ernest Edward (1871 - 1899)', Australian Dictionary of Biography, Volume 10, MUP, 1986, p. 538.

External links
 

1871 births
1899 deaths
19th-century Australian artists
People from Bendigo
Artists from Victoria (Australia)
National Gallery of Victoria Art School alumni